Floraville is one of four historic districts in Lebanon, Ohio listed in the National Register of Historic Places. It is roughly bounded by Keever St. to the west, Cincinnati Ave. to the north, East St. to the east, and Orchard Ave. to the south. Comprising 440 acres, the district includes 61 buildings and 1 structure. It was listed on the National Register of Historic Places on October 10, 1984

History 
The first recorded inhabitants of the area now known as Floraville were a company of Native American Indians that would regularly camp on the hillside just south of Cincinnati Pike (now Cincinnati Avenue). First observed in the winter of 1798, 4 years before Lebanon is platted, they are seen for a short time each spring making sugar in what is now the western end of Floraville.

According to a letter written by John C Skinner, dated October 31, 1889, and published in The Western Star, up until at least 1824 there was only one dwelling, the Maple-Rackett House (229 S Mechanic St.), within the boundaries now considered Floraville. That quickly changed as Lebanon established itself as the most important city in Warren County and a golden age of architecture came to the town. By 1839 there were 10 carpenter and joiner shops with 38 hands, a testament to the building activity in the area. The now wealthy professionals and businessmen looked outside city limits to establish their grand estates. Many set their eyes to the rolling hillside of the old Indian sugar camp, just south of the urban center.

By the mid-nineteenth century Floraville consisted of several large estates along Cincinnati Avenue and South Mechanic Street. The district became known for its sprawling gardens, curved paths, and abundant landscaping, which gave rise to the name Floraville. At the 1851 Ohio General Assembly it was proposed to incorporate the suburb into its own town under the new name. The proposal was described as follows: 

"And be it further enacted by the General Assembly of the State of Ohio, That the town of Floraville, in Warren county, be, and the same is hereby created a town corporate by the name of the town of Floraville, with the following boundaries, to wit: Beginning at the north-west corner of a lot of ground, now owned by Matthew Koogle, running thence in a southerly direction to the south-west corner of a lot of six acres and owned by George Miller, thence east to a point in the lands of A. H. Denelavy, and south from the west corner of a lot owned by John E. Dey, thence north to said corner of said Dey’s lot, thence west along the Lebanon and Chillicothe road to a lane running through John E. Dey’s land, thence down said lane to a road leading to Wilmington, thence west along the centre of said road to the line between the lands of Simon Suydam and Amos Smith, thence south on said Suydam and Smith’s line to the south bank of Turtle Creek, thence down the south bank of said creek to the place of beginning. The said town of Floraville shall be entitled to all the privileges, and be subject to all the restrictions, conferred and imposed by the provisions of an act entitled An act for the regulation of incorporated towns"In March 1862 Floraville was annexed into the growing city of Lebanon, but its splendor was not lost. In an 1873 letter to the editor of the Jackson Standard the district was described as follows:"Floraville, the south-western part of [Lebanon], is the prettiest part of it. It is noted for its nice and most beautiful buildings, and in the yards there are many beautiful trees, of different kinds, which adds a great deal to its appearance"Nearing the turn of the century, some of the large land tracts were partitioned into smaller lots for more modest homes. A few decades later, the demand for stately mansions plummeted with the onset of the Great Depression. Most of the houses stayed intact but were repurposed to fit the changing demographic: Glendower Historic Mansion (105 Cincinnati Ave) became a museum and is still available for tours through the Warren County Historical Society; Runyan Homestead (220 Mechanic St) began functioning as a nursing home and remained as such for almost 70 years; a number of other homes were converted to multi-unit apartments. In more recent years a renewed interest in restoring these iconic structures has taken hold. Most have been reverted to single-family dwellings and restored to their former glory. The proximity to downtown Lebanon and picturesque setting make the ideal location for a bed and breakfast or vacation rental, both of which can currently be found scattered throughout the district. In October 1984 the area was listed on the US Register of Historic Places, further preserving Floraville's history for many more generations to come.

Prominent Residents 

 Judge Willard Wright, father of internationally known industrial designer Russel Wright
 Robert Boake
 J. Milton Williams
 Judge G. W. Stanley
 Judge James Allen Runyan
 Durbin Ward, attorney, statesman and Civil War general
 Richard S. Thomas, early town lawyer and state senator from 1806 to 1808
 William H P Denny, newspaper editor, publisher, and politician
 Andrew Graham McBurney, politician and lieutenant governor of Ohio
 John C Skinner, Fourth Warren County Auditor and dry good merchant
 Professor Alfred Holbrook, First President of the National Normal University

Architecture 
Characterized by gracious homes on spacious lots, the Floraville Historic District retains many of the architecturally significant estates that established its place in history. Some of the first homes in the area, built in the 1830s and 1840s, were substantial cube-like brick structures patterned after the Greek Revival movement. They can be easily identified by piers across the front facade, simple classical decorations and roof lines adorned with heavy dentil molding. The earliest example can be found at 215 South Mechanic Street and a similar design can be seen in Runyan Homestead (220 S Mechanic St.) across the street. Glendower Historic Mansion (105 Cincinnati Ave.) is another fine example of the Greek Revival design as well as is its neighbor, The Pillars (119 Cincinnati Ave.), no doubt because the original owners were brothers-in-law bent on one upping each other.

Almost concurrent with the Greek Revival movement, elements of the Gothic Revival also began to emerge in homes around Floraville. The most notable example is The Cropper House AKA The Gables (229 Cincinnati Ave). Typified by its pointed arches and gingerbread-ike trim, the mullioned windows contain 108 separate panes of glass.

In the housing boom that followed the Civil War, aesthetics began to shift toward Italianate styles. Many variations on the design can be spotted throughout Floraville, including an iconic Italian Villa known as The Gothic (207 Cincinnati Ave.) that also borrows many Gothic elements responsible for its name. Some of the earlier Italianate homes, like Burl Manor (230 S Mechanic St.), are similar in shape and size to the Greek Revival estates, while those built closer to the turn of the century are more modest frame residences with pedimented lintels, dog-ear window surrounds, bracketed friezes, and porches with cut-out designs in the posts.

Notable homes

References 

History of Ohio
National Register of Historic Places in Warren County, Ohio
Historic districts on the National Register of Historic Places in Ohio